Dame Caroline Elizabeth Wilson  (born 12 August 1970) is a British diplomat and lawyer who assumed office as the British Ambassador to China in September 2020.

Early life and education
Wilson was born on 12 August 1970. She was educated at Sevenoaks School before attending Downing College, Cambridge, where she gained an MA in law. She was called to the Bar at Middle Temple in 1993, then gained a degree in European Community law (licence spéciale en droit européen) at the Institute for European Studies of the Université Libre de Bruxelles.

Career
Wilson joined the Foreign and Commonwealth Office (FCO) in 1995 and served in Beijing, Brussels and Moscow in various posts. She was the Consul-General to Hong Kong and Non-Resident Consul General to Macau from 2012 to 2016. She became Europe Director at the FCO in 2016. She appeared in a 2018 BBC documentary titled Inside the Foreign Office, which saw her accompany then-Foreign Secretary Boris Johnson on diplomatic engagements in Europe.

In June 2020, she was appointed as British Ambassador to China; she succeeded Dame Barbara Woodward in September 2020.

In November 2021, The Times and other newspapers reported "a row" between British foreign secretary Liz Truss and Wilson relating to a letter Wilson had sent to National Security Council members about relations with the Chinese government, questioning Truss's hawkish stance against China.

Personal life
In addition to her native English, Wilson speaks French, German, Russian, Mandarin Chinese, and Cantonese.

Honours
Wilson was appointed Companion of the Order of St Michael and St George (CMG) in the 2016 New Year Honours and Dame Commander of the Order of St Michael and St George (DCMG) in the 2021 New Year Honours for services to British foreign policy.

She was called as a Bencher at Middle Temple in 2013. In 2018, she became an honorary fellow of Downing College, Cambridge.

References

External links 

 

1970 births
Living people
Dames Commander of the Order of St Michael and St George
People educated at Sevenoaks School
Alumni of Downing College, Cambridge
Members of the Middle Temple
Université libre de Bruxelles alumni
British women diplomats
Consuls-General of the United Kingdom in Hong Kong